Jack Lee Sterland (born 7 January 1993) is an English former first-class cricketer.

Sterland was born at Chelmsford in January 1993. He later studied at Loughborough University, where he played two first-class cricket matches for Loughborough MCCU against Sussex and Kent in 2014. He scored 42 runs in his two matches, with a high score of 27.

References

External links

1993 births
Living people
Sportspeople from Chelmsford
Alumni of Loughborough University
English cricketers
Loughborough MCCU cricketers